This is a list of notable drummers that meet Wikipedia's notability guideline for inclusion.

A

 Vinnie Paul Abbott (Pantera, Damageplan, Hellyeah)
 Dave Abbruzzese (Pearl Jam)
 Matt Abts  (Gov't Mule)
 Alex Acuña (Weather Report, Lee Ritenour)
 Daniel Adair (Nickelback, 3 Doors Down)
 Charlie Adams (Yanni, Chameleon)
 Chris Adler (Lamb of God, Megadeth)
 Henry Adler
 Steven Adler (Guns N' Roses, Adler's Appetite)
 Rob Affuso (Skid Row)
 Charly Alberti (Soda Stereo)
 Tommy Aldridge (Black Oak Arkansas, Ted Nugent, Motörhead, Ozzy Osbourne, Whitesnake)
 Tim "Herb" Alexander (Primus)
 Rashied Ali
 Carl Allen
 Rick Allen (Def Leppard)
 Tony Allen (Fela Kuti)
 Barry Altschul
 Vinnie Amico (moe.)
 Paul Amorese (Jack Dishel, Only Son, and Bryan Scary)
 Andy Anderson (The Cure)
 Nicke Andersson (Entombed)
 Phil Anselmo (Viking Crown)
 Carmine Appice (Vanilla Fudge, Cactus, Beck, Bogert & Appice, Rod Stewart, King Kobra, Blue Murder)
 Vinny Appice (Black Sabbath, Dio, Heaven and Hell)
 Fernando Arbex (Barrabás)
 Kenny Aronoff (John Mellencamp, The Smashing Pumpkins, John Fogerty)
 Duncan Arsenault (The Curtain Society)
 Steve Asheim (Deicide)
 Scott Asheton (The Stooges)
 Sampsa "Kita" Astala (Lordi)
 Nick Augusto (Trivium)
 Jerry Augustyniak (10,000 Maniacs)
 Mick Avory (The Kinks)
 Martin Axenrot (Witchery, Bloodbath, Opeth)
 Carla Azar (Autolux)

B

 Robbie Bachman (Bachman–Turner Overdrive)
 Johnny "Bee" Badanjek (The Detroit Wheels, The Rockets)
 Donald Bailey
 Mike Baird
 Ginger Baker (Cream, Blind Faith)
 Donny Baldwin, (Jefferson Starship)
 Butch Ballard
 Frankie Banali (Quiet Riot, W.A.S.P.)
 Paul Barbarin
 David Barbarossa (Adam and the Ants, Bow Wow Wow)
 John Barbata (Jefferson Airplane)
Lori Barbero
 Danny Barcelona (Louis Armstrong)
 Nicholas Barker (Cradle of Filth, Dimmu Borgir, Lock Up, Brujeria, Old Man's Child)
 Travis Barker (The Aquabats, Blink-182, Box Car Racer, Transplants, +44)
 Brandon Barnes (Rise Against)
 Barriemore Barlow (Jethro Tull)
 Joey Baron (Laurie Anderson)
 Ranjit Barot
 Carlton Barrett (Bob Marley and The Wailers)
 Angel Bartolotta (Team Cybergeist, Dope, Genitorturers)
 Frank Beard (ZZ Top)
 Carter Beauford (Dave Matthews Band)
 Marty Beller (They Might Be Giants)
 Jay Bellerose
 Louie Bellson
 Leila Bela (Pigface)
 Fred Below
 Charlie Benante (Anthrax, S.O.D.)
 Benny Benjamin (Motown, The Funk Brothers)
 Brian Bennett (The Shadows, Marty Wilde)
 David Bennett
 Taz Bentley (The Reverend Horton Heat, Burden Brothers)
 James Bergstrom (Alice N' Chains, Second Coming)
 Bill Berry (R.E.M.)
 Wuv Bernardo (P.O.D.)
 Pete Best (The Beatles)
 Bev Bevan (The Move, Electric Light Orchestra)
 Graham Bidstrup (The Angels)
 Les Binks (Judas Priest)
 Chuck Biscuits (D.O.A., Black Flag, Danzig)
 Gregg Bissonette (David Lee Roth)
 Curt Bisquera (Elton John, Mick Jagger)
 Jason Bittner (Shadows Fall)
 Cedric Bixler-Zavala (De Facto)
 Jonas Björler (At the Gates)
 Jet Black (The Stranglers)
 Jimmy Carl Black (The Mothers of Invention)
 Cindy Blackman
 Ed Blackwell
 John Blackwell
 Brian Blade (Joni Mitchell)
 Hal Blaine
 Art Blakey
 Michael Bland
 Jody Bleyle (Hazel)
 Jan Axel Blomberg (Arcturus, Mayhem, The Kovenant, Dimmu Borgir, Jørn Lande)
Ryan Alexander Bloom (Havok)
 Bobby Blotzer (Ratt)
 Felix Bohnke (Edguy)
 Mickey Bones
 Bongo Joe Coleman
 Jason Bonham (Bonham, Black Country Communion)
 John Bonham (Led Zeppelin)
 Oskar "Ossi" Bonde (Johnossi)
 Paddy Boom (Scissor Sisters)
 Mike Bordin (Faith No More)
 Paul Bostaph (Forbidden, Slayer, Exodus, Testament)
 Mike Botts (Bread)
 Albert Bouchard (Blue Öyster Cult)
 Roy Boulter (The Farm)
 Rob Bourdon (Linkin Park)
 Garry "Magpie" Bowler (Würzel, Dennis Stratton)
 Moses Boyd
 Terry Bozzio (Frank Zappa, Missing Persons, Korn)
 Mick Bradley (Steamhammer)
 Jerome Brailey (Parliament-Funkadelic )
 Matt Brann (Avril Lavigne)
 Riley Breckenridge (Thrice)
 Don Brewer (Grand Funk Railroad)
 Billy Brimblecom (Blackpool Lights)
 Ned Brower (Rooney)
 Harold Brown (War)
 Mick Brown (Dokken, Lynch Mob, Ted Nugent)
 Ian Browne (Matthew Good Band)
 Bill Bruford (Bruford, Genesis, King Crimson, Yes)
 Bob Bryar (My Chemical Romance)
 Mike Buck
 Rick Buckler (The Jam)
 Budgie (Siouxsie and the Banshees, The Creatures, The Slits)
 Luke Bullen (The Mescaleros, KT Tunstall)
 Clive Bunker (Jethro Tull)
 Larry Bunker
 Richard James Burgess (Landscape)
 Aaron Burckhard (Nirvana)
 Chuck Burgi (Billy Joel)
 Clem Burke (Blondie, The Romantics, Eurythmics, Ramones)
 Dominik Burkhalter
 Hugo Burnham (Gang Of Four)
 Bob Burns (Lynyrd Skynyrd)
 Clive Burr (Iron Maiden)
 Andrew Burrows (Razorlight)
 Ron Bushy (Iron Butterfly)
 Frank Butler

C

 David Calabrese (The Misfits, Graves, Dr. Chud's X-Ward)
 Will Calhoun (Living Colour)
 Phill Calvert (The Birthday Party)
 Matt Cameron (Soundgarden, Pearl Jam)
 Jeff Campitelli (Joe Satriani)
 Brendan Canty (Fugazi)
 Jim Capaldi (Traffic)
 Frank Capp
 Danny Carey (Tool, Pigmy Love Circus)
 Keith Carlock (Steely Dan, James Taylor, Donald Fagen, Walter Becker, John Mayer, Sting}
 Bun E. Carlos (Cheap Trick)
 Denny Carmassi (Montrose, Heart, Coverdale•Page, Whitesnake)
 Patrick Carney (The Black Keys)
 Karen Carpenter (The Carpenters)
 Eric Carr (Kiss)
 Randy Carr (Social Distortion)
 Terri Lyne Carrington
 Adam Carson (AFI)
 Ernest Carter (E Street Band)
 Michael Carvin
 Eloy Casagrande (Sepultura)
 Ed Cassidy (Rising Sons, Spirit)
 Torry Castellano (The Donnas)
 Joey Castillo (Queens of the Stone Age, Danzig)
 Randy Castillo (Ozzy Osbourne, Lita Ford, Mötley Crüe)
 Deen Castronovo (Journey, Bad English, Steve Vai, GZR, Tony MacAlpine, Ozzy Osbourne, Hardline, Cacophony, Marty Friedman, Paul Rodgers)
 Igor Cavalera (Cavalera Conspiracy, Sepultura)
 Cerrone
 Chris Cester (Jet)
 Romeo Challenger (Showaddywaddy, Black Widow)
 Jimmy Chamberlin (The Smashing Pumpkins, Jimmy Chamberlin Complex, Zwan)
 Dennis Chambers
 Martin Chambers (The Pretenders)
 Will Champion (Coldplay)
 Chad Channing (Nirvana)
 Dave Charles (Help Yourself, Dave Edmunds, Kid Creole and the Coconuts)
 Brian Chase (Yeah Yeah Yeahs)
 Arup Chattopadhyay (Indian tabla player)
 Damon Che (Don Caballero)
 Régine Chassagne (Arcade Fire)
 Gary Chester
 Terry Chimes (The Clash, Black Sabbath)
 Brian Chippendale (Lightning Bolt, Mindflayer)
 Brian Choper
 Richard Christy (Death, Control Denied, Iced Earth, Charred Walls of the Damned)
 Kenny Clare
 Chad Clark
 Dave Clark (The Dave Clark Five)
 Kenny Clarke
 Michael Clarke (The Byrds)
 Louie Clemente (Testament)
 Doug Clifford (Creedence Clearwater Revival)
 Jimmy Cobb
 Billy Cobham (Mahavishnu Orchestra)
 King Coffey (Butthole Surfers)
 John Coghlan (Status Quo)
 Vinnie Colaiuta (Frank Zappa, Sting, Joni Mitchell)
 Richard Colburn  (Belle and Sebastian)
 Cozy Cole
 Claude Coleman  (Ween)
 Marino Colina
 Grant Collins
 Phil Collins (Genesis, Brand X, Flaming Youth, Frida)
 Simon Collins 
 Bobby Colomby (Blood, Sweat & Tears)
 Scott Columbus (Manowar)
 Ricardo Confessori (Angra, Shaaman)
 Gerry Conway
 Paul Cook (Sex Pistols)
 Tré Cool (Green Day, Foxboro Hot Tubs, The Network, The Lookouts)
 Rick Coonce (The Grass Roots)
 Jason Cooper (The Cure)
 Stewart Copeland (Curved Air, The Police, Animal Logic, Oysterhead)
 Caroline Corr (The Corrs)
 Jody Cortez (Christopher Cross, Billy Idol)
 Billy Cotton
 Scott Crago (Eagles, Sheryl Crow, Stevie Wonder)
 Shawn "Clown" Crahan (Slipknot)
 Peter Criss (Kiss)
 Dale Crover (Melvins, Nirvana)
 Dave Culross
 Abe Cunningham (Deftones)
 Mickey Curry (Bryan Adams, Hall & Oates, The Cult)
 Chris Curtis (The Searchers)
 Chris Cutler (Henry Cow, Art Bears)

D

 Diesel Dahl (TNT)
 Brann Dailor (Mastodon)
 Dino Danelli (Young Rascals, The Rascals)
 Marc Danzeisen (Riverdogs, Gilby Clarke, Little Caesar)
 Jay Dee Daugherty (Patti Smith Group)
 Chris Dave (Robert Glasper, D'Angelo)
 Adrienne Davies (Earth)
 Bevan Davies (Madfly, Comes with the Fall, Danzig)
 Billie Davies
 Cliff Davies (If, Ted Nugent)
 Dennis Davis (David Bowie)
 Seth Davis (Abigail's Ghost, Exhorder)
 Mikkey Dee (King Diamond, Motörhead, Scorpions)
 Pete de Freitas (Echo & the Bunnymen)
 Jimmy DeGrasso (Alice Cooper, Lita Ford, Ozzy Osbourne, White Lion, Suicidal Tendencies, Y&T, Megadeth)
 Jack DeJohnette
 John Densmore (The Doors)
 Eric Delaney
 Victor DeLorenzo (Violent Femmes)
 Trav Demsey (The Living End)
 Jerome Deupree (Morphine)
 Liberty DeVitto (Billy Joel)
 Malcolm Dick (Blackmore's Night)
 Werner "Zappi" Diermaier (Faust)
 Adam Deitch (Lettuce (band))
 Dennis Diken (The Smithereens)
 Jerome Dillon (Nine Inch Nails)
 Klaus Dinger (Kraftwerk)
 Josh Dion (Chuck Loeb)
 Steve DiStanislao (CPR, David Gilmour)
 Baby Dodds
 Brian Doherty (They Might Be Giants, John Linnell)
 Micky Dolenz (The Monkees)
 John Dolmayan (System of a Down, Scars on Broadway)
 Howard Donald (Take That)
 Virgil Donati (Planet X, Ring of Fire, Seven the Hardway, CAB, Derek Sherinian, Tony MacAlpine, Steve Vai)
 Mitch Dorge (Crash Test Dummies)
 Paul Doucette (Matchbox Twenty)
 Dave Douglas (Relient K, Agnes)
 Brian Downey (Thin Lizzy)
 Hamid Drake
 Gary Driscoll  (Rainbow, Elf)
 Shawn Drover (Megadeth)
 Steven Drozd (The Flaming Lips)
 Greg Drudy (Interpol, Saetia, Hot Cross)
 Spencer Dryden (Jefferson Airplane)
 Josh Dun (Twenty One Pilots, House of Heroes)
 Aynsley Dunbar
 Sly Dunbar
 Ryan Dusick (Maroon 5, Kara's Flowers)
 Mario Duplantier (Gojira)
 Alex Duthart
 Nick D'Virgilio (Genesis, Tears for Fears, Spock's Beard)
 Orri Páll Dýrason (Sigur Rós)

E

 Sheila E. (Prince)
 Roger Earl (Foghat)
 Brent Eccles (The Angels)
 Graeme Edge (The Moody Blues)
 Kian Egan (Westlife)
 Phil Ehart (Kansas)
 Christian Eigner (Depeche Mode)
 Greg Eklund (Everclear, The Oohlas)
 Blas Elias (Slaughter)
 Manny Elias (Tears for Fears)
 Bobby Elliott (The Hollies)
 Dennis Elliott (Foreigner)
 Stuart Elliott (The Alan Parsons Project, Kate Bush, Steve Harley & Cockney Rebel)
 Greg Elmore (Quicksilver Messenger Service)
 Sonny Emory
 Jim Eno (Spoon)
 Lorne Entress
 Josh Eppard (Coheed and Cambria)
 Adrian Erlandsson (At the Gates, The Haunted, Cradle of Filth, Brujeria, Paradise Lost)
 Daniel Erlandsson (Arch Enemy, Carcass)
 Greg Errico (Sly and the Family Stone)
 Peter Erskine (Weather Report)
 Lester Estelle Jr. (Stars Go Dim, Pillar)
 Guy Evans (Van der Graaf Generator)

F

 Tony Fagenson (Eve 6, The Sugi Tap)
 Richard Falomir (The Aquabats)
 Danny Farrant (Buzzcocks)
 Jon Farriss (INXS)
 Zac Farro (Paramore)
 Tats Faustino
 Chris Fehn (Slipknot)
 John Fell (The Heroine Sheiks)
 Steve Felton (Mushroomhead)
 Fenriz (Darkthrone)
 Frank Ferrer (Guns N' Roses)
 Steve Ferrone (Tom Petty and the Heartbreakers, Average White Band)
 Billy Ficca (Television)
 Alvin Fielder
 Anton Fig (Frehley's Comet, Cyndi Lauper, CBS Orchestra, Joe Bonamassa)
 Monika Fikerle (Love of Diagrams)
 Ginger Fish (Marilyn Manson)
 Eddie Fisher (OneRepublic)
 Jon Fishman (Phish)
 Mick Fleetwood (Fleetwood Mac, John Mayall & the Bluesbreakers)
 Blake Fleming  (The Mars Volta)
 Chuck Flores
 Matt Flynn (Maroon 5)
 Justin Foley (Killswitch Engage, Blood Has Been Shed)
 Steve Foley (The Replacements, Curtiss A)
 D. J. Fontana (Elvis Presley)
 Sam Fogarino (Interpol)
 Shannon Forrest
 Andrew Forsman (The Fall of Troy)
 Keith Forsey (Giorgio Moroder productions, Donna Summer, Boney M.
 Al Foster
 Jimmy Fox (James Gang)
 Lucas Fox (Motörhead)
 Christopher Franke (Tangerine Dream, Agitation Free)
 Chris Frantz (Talking Heads)
 John French
 Josh Freese (The Vandals, A Perfect Circle, Guns N' Roses, New Radicals, Nine Inch Nails, Black Light Burns, Sublime with Rome, Devo)
 Tristan Fry (Sky)
 Frost (Satyricon, 1349)
 Mike Fuentes (Pierce the Veil, Isles & Glaciers)
 Travis Fullerton
 Peter Furler (Newsboys)

G

 Steve Gadd (Paul Simon, Eric Clapton, Steely Dan)
 Stéphane Galland (Aka Moon, Zap Mama, Octurn)
 Glen "Archie" Gamble (Helix)
 Allan Ganley
 Jeremy Gara (Arcade Fire)
 Rob Gardner (Guns N' Roses)
 Matt Garstka (Animals as Leaders)
 Bruce Gary (The Knack)
 Josh Garza (The Secret Machines)
 Jerry Gaskill (King's X)
 Jean-Paul Gaster (Clutch, The Bakerton Group)
 Bud Gaugh (Sublime, Eyes Adrift)
 Mel Gaynor (Simple Minds)
 Rafael Gayol (Leonard Cohen)
 Bjorn Gelotte (In Flames)
 Liam Genockey (Steeleye Span)
 Frank Gibson, Jr.
 Peter Giger
 Michael Giles (King Crimson)
 Martin Gilks (The Wonder Stuff)
 Pete Gill (Saxon, Motörhead)
 Aaron Gillespie (Underoath, The Almost)
 Benjamin Gillies (Silverchair)
 Russell Gilbrook (Uriah Heep)
 Marco Giovino (Robert Plant, Tom Jones, Norah Jones, John Cale)
 Danny Goffey (Supergrass)
 Chris Gohde (Mistrust, My Sister's Machine)
 Alex González (Maná)
 Danny Gottlieb (Pat Metheny Group, Mahavishnu Orchestra)
 Jim Gordon (Derek and the Dominos, Traffic)
 Steve Gorman (The Black Crowes)
 Phil Gould (Level 42)
 Chad Gracey (Live, The Gracious Few)
 Bobby Graham
 Ed Graham (The Darkness)
 Sebastien Grainger (Death from Above 1979)
 Derek Grant (Alkaline Trio)
 Steve Grantley (Stiff Little Fingers)
 Milford Graves
 Rocky Gray (Evanescence, Machina)
 Jeremiah Green (Modest Mouse)
 Nate Greenslit (H.U.M.A.N.W.I.N.E.)
 Sonny Greer (Duke Ellington)
 Adrian Griffin (28 Days)
 Dale Griffin (Mott the Hoople)
 Dave Grohl (Scream, Nirvana, Foo Fighters, Queens of the Stone Age, Tenacious D, Them Crooked Vultures)
 Andy "Stoker" Growcott (Dexys Midnight Runners, General Public)
 Trilok Gurtu

H
 Tomas Haake (Meshuggah)
 Sib Hashian (Boston)
 Kai Hahto (Wintersun, Max On The Rox) 
 Tony Hajjar (At the Drive-In, Sparta)
 Omar Hakim (Sting, Weather Report, Dire Straits, Madonna)
 Tubby Hall
 Chico Hamilton
 Jeff Hamilton
 Paul Hanley (The Fall, The Lovers)
Hein Frode Hansen (Theatre of Tragedy)
 Simon Hanson (Squeeze)
 Zac Hanson
 Beaver Harris
 Gavin Harrison (Porcupine Tree, King Crimson)
 Oscar Harrison (Ocean Colour Scene)
 Grant Hart (Hüsker Dü)
 Mickey Hart (Grateful Dead)
 Jason Hartless (Ted Nugent)
 John Hartman (The Doobie Brothers)
 Kevin Haskins (Bauhaus)
 Steve Hass (John Scofield, Ravi Coltrane, The Manhattan Transfer, Suzanne Vega, Cher)
 Jordan Hastings (Alexisonfire)
 John Haughm (Agalloch)
 Ian Haugland (Europe, Brazen Abbot, Clockwise, Last Autumn's Dream, Baltimoore)
 Roger Hawkins (Muscle Shoals Rhythm Section, Traffic)
 Taylor Hawkins (Alanis Morissette, Foo Fighters, Taylor Hawkins and the Coattail Riders)
 Yoshiki Hayashi (X Japan)
 Roy Haynes
 Richie Hayward (Little Feat)
 Topper Headon (The Clash)
 Albert "Tootie" Heath
 Matt Helders (Arctic Monkeys)
 Levon Helm (The Band)
 Gerry Hemingway (Anthony Braxton)
 Don Henley (The Eagles)
 Bob Henrit  (The Kinks)
 Danny Herrera (Napalm Death)
 Raymond Herrera (Fear Factory)
 Paul Hester (Split Enz, Crowded House)
 Steve Hewitt (Placebo)
 Billy Higgins
 Zach Hill (Hella)
 Steve Hindalong
 Rob Hirst (Midnight Oil)
 Jon Hiseman (Graham Bond Organisation, Colosseum, Tempest, Colosseum II)
 Bryan Hitt (REO Speedwagon, Wang Chung)
 Russel Hobbs (Gorillaz)
 Nick Hodgson (Kaiser Chiefs)
 Guy Hoffman (BoDeans, Violent Femmes)
 Scott Hoffman (38 Special, O-Town, A. J. McLean)
 Gene Hoglan (Death, Strapping Young Lad, Dethklok, Testament)
 Mike Holoway
 Dave Holland (Judas Priest)
 Gary Holland (Dokken, Great White, Blue Cheer)
 Luke Holland (The Word Alive, I See Stars, Tyler Carter, Miss Fortune, The Evening)
 W. S. Holland (Tennessee Three)
 Malcolm Holmes (Orchestral Manoeuvres In The Dark)
 Bob Holz (Larry Coryell)
 Alex Holzwarth (Rhapsody of Fire, Sieges Even, Avantasia)
 Josh Homme (Eagles of Death Metal)
 Stix Hooper (The Jazz Crusaders)
 Reidar "Horgh" Horghagen (Immortal, Hypocrisy)
 Michael Hossack (The Doobie Brothers)
 Dominic Howard (Muse)
 Stet Howland
 Earl Hudson (Bad Brains)
 Richard Hughes (Keane)
 Daniel Humair
 Dann Hume (Evermore)
 Will Hunt (Dark New Day, Evanescence)
 Craig Hunter (The Philosopher Kings)
 Andy Hurley (Fall Out Boy)
 George Hurley (Minutemen, Firehose)
 Gary Husband (John McLaughlin, Level 42)
 Zakir Hussain

I

 Tris Imboden (Chicago)
 Inferno (Behemoth, Witchmaster)
 It (Abruptum)
 Jack Irons (Red Hot Chili Peppers, Pearl Jam)
 Ashton Irwin (5 Seconds of Summer)
 Ipe Ivandić (Bijelo Dugme)

J

 Al Jackson, Jr. (Booker T. & The M.G.'s, Otis Redding)
 Jaimoe (The Allman Brothers Band) 
 Steve Jansen (Japan)
 Bobby Jarzombek, (Spastic Ink, Sebastian Bach)
 Ken Jay (Static-X)
 Helmut Jederknüller
 Darren Jessee (Ben Folds Five)
 Akira Jimbo
 Steve Jocz (Sum 41)
 Anders Johansson (HammerFall, Full Force, Yngwie Malmsteen, Jens Johansson)
 Matt Johnson
 Ralph Johnson (Earth, Wind, & Fire)
 Ben Johnston (Biffy Clyro)
 Nick Jonas (Jonas Brothers)
 Elvin Jones (John Coltrane)
 G. B. Jones (Fifth Column)
 Jo Jones
 Kenney Jones (Small Faces, Faces, The Who)
 Mickey Jones (The First Edition, Bob Dylan, Johnny Rivers)
 Philly Joe Jones
 Benn Jordan (The Flashbulb)
 Steve Jordan (CBS Orchestra, X-pensive Winos, Eric Clapton)
 Joey Jordison (Slipknot)
 Dave Joyal (Silent Drive)
 Harry Judd (McFly)
 Jussi 69 (the 69 Eyes)

K

 Kami (Malice Mizer)
 Kang Min-hyuk (CNBLUE)
 Karsh Kale
 Mika "Gas Lipstick" Karppinen (HIM)
 Manu Katché
 Chris Kavanagh (Sigue Sigue Sputnik, Big Audio Dynamite II)
Senri Kawaguchi 
 Nao Kawakita (Maximum The Hormone)
 John Keeble (Spandau Ballet)
 Jimmy Keegan (Santana, Kenny Loggins, Spock's Beard)
 Patrick Keeler (The Raconteurs, The Greenhornes)
 Mamady Keïta
 Nate Kelley
 Mike Kellie (Spooky Tooth, The Only Ones)
 Johnny Kelly (Type O Negative)
 Jim Keltner (Ry Cooder, George Harrison, Traveling Wilburys)
 Dave Kerman (5uu's, Present)
 Stuart Kershaw (Orchestral Manoeuvres in the Dark)
 Lee Kerslake (Uriah Heep, Ozzy Osbourne)
 Ontronik Khachaturian (System of a Down)
 Witold Kiełtyka (Decapitated)
 John Kiffmeyer (Green Day)
 Billy Kilson
 Jim Kimball (The Jesus Lizard, Firewater)
 David King (The Bad Plus)
 Sean Kinney (Alice in Chains)
 Tony Kinsey (Johnny Dankworth)
 Pete Kircher (Status Quo)
 Basil Kirchin
 Simon Kirke (Free, Bad Company)
 Ted Kirkpatrick (Tourniquet)
 Frank Klepacki
 Johnny Klein
 George Kollias (Nile)
 Famoudou Konaté
 James Kottak (Kingdom Come, Scorpions)
 Joey Kramer (Aerosmith)
 Eric Kretz (Stone Temple Pilots)
 Bill Kreutzmann (Grateful Dead)
 Gene Krupa
 Dave Krusen (Pearl Jam)
 Russ Kunkel (Jackson Browne, Carly Simon, James Taylor, David Crosby, Graham Nash)
 Sami Kuoppamäki (Kingston Wall, Apocalyptica)
 Uli Kusch (Masterplan, Ride the Sky, Beautiful Sin, Symfonia, Helloween, Gamma Ray, Holy Moses, Mekong Delta, Roland Grapow, Sinner)

L

 Abe Laboriel, Jr. (Paul McCartney)
 Papa Jack Laine
 Corky Laing (Mountain, West, Bruce and Laing)
 Jay Lane (Ratdog)
 Thomas Lang
 Shannon Larkin (Godsmack, Ugly Kid Joe, Wrathchild America)
 Joel Larson (The Grass Roots, The Merry-Go-Round, The Turtles, Gene Clark, Lee Michaels)
 Jon Larsen  (Volbeat)
 Fredrik Larzon (Millencolin)
 Fergal Lawler (The Cranberries)
 Chris Layton (Double Trouble)
 Athena Lee (KrunK)
 Jon Lee (Feeder)
 Michael Lee (Little Angels, Page and Plant, The Cult)
 Tommy Lee (Rock Star Supernova, Mötley Crüe, Methods of Mayhem)
 Lucky Lehrer (Circle Jerks)
 Larry Lelli
 JB Leonor  (The Dawn)
 Matt Letley (Status Quo, Kim Wilde)
 Shannon Leto (Thirty Seconds to Mars)
 Stan Levey
 Mel Lewis
 Jaki Liebezeit (Can)
 Carlo Little (The Rolling Stones, Cyril Davies, Screaming Lord Sutch)
 Pierre van der Linden (Focus, Brainbox)
 Daniel Löble (Helloween)
 Pete Lockett
 Torstein Lofthus (Shining, Torun Eriksen, Maria Mena)
 Dave Lombardo (Slayer)
 Larrie Londin (Journey, Steve Perry)
 Derek Longmuir (Bay City Rollers)
 Martin Lopez (Soen, Opeth, Amon Amarth)
 Vini Lopez (E Street Band)
 Bill Lordan (Sly & the Family Stone, Robin Trower)
 David Lovering (Pixies)
 Bernard Lubat (Stan Getz, Claude Nougaro...)
 Ray Luzier (Korn, David Lee Roth, Army of Anyone, KXM)
 Shannon Lucas (All That Remains, The Black Dahlia Murder)
 Stan Lynch (Tom Petty and the Heartbreakers)
 Ged Lynch (Peter Gabriel)

M

 John Macaluso (Starbreaker, Ark, Yngwie Malmsteen, TNT, Vitalij Kuprij, Alex Masi, Riot, Powermad, Jørn Lande, Marco Sfogli)
 Dave Mackintosh (DragonForce)
 Peter Magadini
 Mark Maher (Spiderbait)
 Chris Maitland (Porcupine Tree, Kino)
 Mike Malinin (Goo Goo Dolls)
 Samantha Maloney (Hole, Mötley Crüe, Eagles of Death Metal, Peaches)
 Mike Mangini (Dream Theater, Steve Vai, Annihilator, Extreme, MullMuzzler, James LaBrie, Tribe of Judah)
 Shelly Manne
 Bryan Mantia (Primus, Guns N' Roses)
 Larance Marable
 Raimund Marasigan (The Eraserheads, Cambio)
 Jess Margera (CKY)
 Cory Marks
 Jerry Marotta (Peter Gabriel)
 Rick Marotta
 John Marshall
 Billy Martin (Medeski Martin & Wood)
 Chris Mars (The Replacements)
 Barrett Martin (Screaming Trees, Mad Season)
 Andrew Martinez (Nekromantix)
 J Mascis
 Harvey Mason (Herbie Hancock, Fourplay)
 Nick Mason (Pink Floyd)
 Pat Mastelotto (Mr. Mister, King Crimson)
 Ian Matthews (Kasabian)
 Dave Mattacks
 Jojo Mayer
 John Mayhew (Genesis)
 Roy Mayorga (Soulfly, Amen, Ozzy Osbourne, Stone Sour)
 Nicko McBrain (Iron Maiden)
 Sam McCandless (Cold)
 Tony McCarroll (Oasis)
 Paul McCartney (The Beatles, Wings)
 Dave McClain (Machine Head)
 Andrew McCulloch (King Crimson, Fields, Greenslade)
 Linda McDonald (The Iron Maidens, Phantom Blue)
 Michael McDonald
 Matthew McDonough (Mudvayne)
 Robbie McIntosh  (The Average White Band)
 Jason McGerr (Death Cab For Cutie, Eureka Farm)
 Christopher McGuire
 Mac McNeilly (The Jesus Lizard, Come)
 Ed McTaggart
 Tony Meehan (The Shadows)
 Dave Mello (Operation Ivy)
 Nick Menza  (Megadeth)
 Jerry Mercer  (April Wine, Mashmakhan, The Wackers)
 Miroslav Milatović (Riblja Čorba, Warriors)
 Buddy Miles (Band of Gypsys)
 Butch Miles (Count Basie)
 David Milhous (Lippy's Garden)
 Russ Miller (studio drummer)
 Marco Minnemann
 Mitch Mitchell (The Jimi Hendrix Experience)
 Zigaboo Modeliste (The Meters)
 Pierre Moerlen
 Ralph Molina (Crazy Horse)
 Keith Moon (The Who)
 Gil Moore (Triumph)
 Sean Moore (Manic Street Preachers)
 Stanton Moore (Galactic)
 Airto Moreira (Hermeto Pascoal)
 Joe Morello (Dave Brubeck Quartet)
 Dindin Moreno (Parokya ni Edgar)
 Fabrizio Moretti (The Strokes)
 Charlie Morgan
 Rod Morgenstein (Winger, Dixie Dregs)
 Oscar Moro (Los Gatos, La Máquina de Hacer Pájaros, Serú Girán, Riff)
 Lee Morris (Paradise Lost, Magnum)
 Kenny Morris (Siouxsie and the Banshees)
 Stephen Morris (Joy Division, New Order)
 Lindy Morrison (The Go-Betweens)
 Everett Morton  (The Beat)
 Ian Mosley (Marillion)
 Jon Moss (Culture Club)
 Paul Motian
 Andy Mrotek (The Academy Is...)
 Idris Muhammad
 Larry Mullen Jr. (U2)
 Luke Munns (Hillsong United, Brooke Fraser)
 Billy Murcia (New York Dolls)
 Sunny Murray
 Alan Myers (Devo)

N

 Paul "P.H." Naffah (The Refreshments), (Roger Clyne and The Peacemakers)
 David Narcizo (Throwing Muses)
 Jeff Nelson (Minor Threat)
 Sandy Nelson
 Jukka Nevalainen (Nightwish, Sethian)
 Andy Newmark (Sly & the Family Stone, Roxy Music, ABC, Eric Clapton)
 Anika Nilles (independent)
 Jerry Nolan (New York Dolls, The Heartbreakers)
 Paul Noonan (Bell X1)
 Butch Norton (Eels)
 Adam Nussbaum

O

 Ole "Bone W. Machine" Öhman (Dissection, Ophthalamia, Deathstars)
 Babatunde Olatunji
 Mattias Olsson (Änglagård)
 Nigel Olsson (Elton John, Uriah Heep, Plastic Penny)
 Joey Osbourne (Acid King)
 John Otto (Limp Bizkit)
 Ken Owen (Carcass)

P

 Ian Paice (Deep Purple, Whitesnake)
 Tony Palermo (Ten Foot Pole, Unwritten Law, Pulley, Papa Roach)
 Carl Palmer (Emerson, Lake & Palmer, Asia)
 Earl Palmer
 Panda Bear (Animal Collective)
 John Panozzo (Styx)
 Pete Parada (The Offspring, Saves the Day, Jackson United, Face to Face)
 Andrew Paresi (Morrissey, Buck's Fizz)
 Andy Parker (UFO)
 Melvin Parker (Beach Boys)
 Deantoni Parks
 John Paris (Earth, Wind & Fire)
 Jack Parnell
 Juanita Parra (Los Jaivas)
 Gene Parsons (Nashville West, The Byrds, The Flying Burrito Brothers)
 Longineu W. Parsons III (Yellowcard)
 Ted Parsons (Prong, Godflesh, Jesu)
 José Pasillas (Incubus)
 Sonny Payne (Count Basie)
 Neil Peart (Rush)
 D. H. Peligro (Dead Kennedys)
 Chris Pennie (Dillinger Escape Plan, Coheed and Cambria)
 Stephen Perkins (Jane's Addiction, The Panic Channel)
 A. J. Pero (Twisted Sister)
 Doane Perry (Jethro Tull)
 Dan Peters (Mudhoney, Nirvana, Bundle of Hiss, Screaming Trees)
 Debbi Peterson (The Bangles)
 Darrin Pfeiffer (Goldfinger)
 Slim Jim Phantom (The Stray Cats)
 Scott Phillips (Creed, Alter Bridge)
 Simon Phillips (Toto, Judas Priest, Hiromi Uehara, Jeff Beck, Mick Jagger, The Michael Schenker Group, Protocol, The Who)
 Jason Pierce (Our Lady Peace, Paramore, Justin Bieber) 
 Mark Pickerel (Screaming Trees, Truly)
 Florian Pilkington-Miksa (Curved Air)
 Dan Pinto
 Demetra Plakas (L7)
 Jeff Plate (Savatage, Trans-Siberian Orchestra, Metal Church)
 Eric Platz
 Daniel Platzman (Imagine Dragons)
 Derrick Plourde (Lagwagon)
 Mick Pointer (Marillion, Arena)
 Gerry Polci (Frankie Valli and the Four Seasons)
 Mike Portnoy (Dream Theater, Liquid Tension Experiment, Transatlantic, Avenged Sevenfold, Adrenaline Mob, The Winery Dogs, Shattered Fortress, Sons Of Apollo)
 Cozy Powell  (Rainbow, Emerson, Lake and Powell, Jeff Beck Group, Whitesnake, Black Sabbath, The Brian May Band)
 Gary Powell (The Libertines, Dirty Pretty Things)
 Tim Powles (The Church)
 Jeff Porcaro (Toto)
 Steve Prestwich (Cold Chisel)
 Thomas Pridgen (The Memorials, The Mars Volta, Juliette Lewis)
 Prince
 Viv Prince (Pretty Things)
 Zbigniew Robert Promiński (Behemoth, Witchmaster, Azarath, Artrosis)
 Bernard "Pretty" Purdie
 Maurice Purtill (Glenn Miller Orchestra)
 Artimus Pyle (Lynyrd Skynyrd)

Q

 Joel Quartermain (Eskimo Joe)
 Questlove (The Roots)
 Marc Quiñones  (Allman Brothers Band)

R

 Krzysztof Raczkowski (Vader)
 Jaska Raatikainen (Children of Bodom)
 Alla Rakha
 Tommy Ramone (Ramones)
 Vesa Ranta (Sentenced)
 Herman Rarebell (Scorpions)
 Dave Raun (Lagwagon, Me First and the Gimme Gimmes)
 Razzle (Hanoi Rocks)
 Scott Raynor (Blink-182)
 Brett Reed (Rancid)
 Scott Reeder (Fu Manchu)
 Jurgen Reil (Kreator)
 Jim Reilly (Stiff Little Fingers)
 Sean Reinert (Cynic, Æon Spoke, Gordian Knot, Death, Aghora)
 Jonas Renkse (October Tide)
 Tony Reno (Europe)
 Buddy Rich
 Jeff Rich (Status Quo)
 Bob Richards (Man, Asia, Adrian Smith Band)
 Tony Richards (W.A.S.P.)
 Blake Richardson (Between the Buried and Me, Glass Casket)
 Bill Rieflin (Ministry, R.E.M.)
 Karriem Riggins (Diana Krall, Mulgrew Miller, Ray Brown)
 Herlin Riley
 John B. Riley
 Steve Riley (W.A.S.P., L.A. Guns)
 Bobby "Z" Rivkin (The Revolution)
 Robo (Black Flag, The Misfits)
 Max Roach
 Brad Roberts (Jizmak Da Gusha, Gwar)
 David Robinson (The Modern Lovers, The Cars)
 John "JR" Robinson
 Scott Rockenfield (Queensrÿche)
 Rikki Rockett (Poison)
 Derek Roddy  (Hate Eternal, Nile, Malevolent Creation)
 Morgan Rose  (Sevendust)
 Hamish Rosser  (The Vines)
 Dave Rowntree (Blur, The Ailerons)
 Tony Royster Jr. (Imajin)
 Eddie Rubin (Neil Diamond, Billie Holiday, Johnny Rivers)
 Ilan Rubin (Lostprophets,  Denver Harbor)
 Steve Rucker (Bee Gees)
 Phil Rudd (AC/DC)
 Jason Rullo (Symphony X)
 Todd Rundgren
 Michael Rushton (Steamhammer)
 Joe Russo (Benevento/Russo Duo)
 John Rutsey (Rush)

S

 Siddharth Nagarajan
 Sakura (L'Arc-en-Ciel, Zigzo, Sons of All Pussys)
 Peter Salisbury (The Verve)
Samoth (Thou Shalt Suffer)
 Doug Sampson (Iron Maiden)
 Gar Samuelson (Megadeth)
 Bobby Sanabria
 Antonio Sanchez (Pat Metheny Group)
 Neil Sanderson (Three Days Grace)
 Erik Sandin (NOFX)
 Pete Sandoval (Morbid Angel)
 Rat Scabies (The Damned)
 Bobby Schayer (Bad Religion)
 Kate Schellenbach (Beastie Boys, Luscious Jackson)
 Christoph Schneider (Rammstein)
 Gina Schock (The Go-Go's)
 Allan Schwartzberg (Mountain, The Group with No Name)
 Jon "Bermuda" Schwartz ("Weird Al" Yankovic)
 Jason Schwartzman (Phantom Planet)
 Stefan Schwarzmann (Accept, U.D.O., Running Wild, X-Wild, Krokus, Helloween)
 Ingo Schwichtenberg (Helloween)
 Andrew Scott (Sloan)
 Bon Scott (The Spektors)
 Kliph Scurlock (The Flaming Lips)
 Ryan Seaman (Falling In Reverse, The Bigger Lights, I Am Ghost)
 Phil Seamen (Jack Parnell, Joe Harriott, Ronnie Scott, Tubby Hayes, Big Bill Broonzy)
 Philip Selway (Radiohead)
 Danny Seraphine (Chicago)
 Gabe Serbian (The Locust)
Shagrath (Dimmu Borgir)
 Patty Schemel (Hole, Juliette Lewis) 
 Chris Sharrock (The La's, Oasis)
 Snowy Shaw (King Diamond, Memento Mori, Mercyful Fate, Notre Dame, Dream Evil, Kee Marcello's K2, Ralf Scheepers, Nightrage, Sabaton)
 Ed Shaughnessy (Doc Severinsen, The Tonight Show Starring Johnny Carson)
 Steve Shelley (Sonic Youth)
 Seb Shelton (Dexys Midnight Runners)
 Jerry Shirley (Humble Pie, Fastway)
 Michael Shrieve (Santana)
 Rick Shutter
 Bob Siebenberg (Supertramp)
 David Silveria (KoRn)
 John Silver (Genesis)
 Eric Singer (Kiss, Alice Cooper, Black Sabbath, Brian May)
 Jeff Singer (Paradise Lost)
 Zutty Singleton
 Joe Sirois (The Mighty Mighty Bosstones, Street Dogs)
 Sivamani
 Martin Marthus Skaroupka (Cradle of Filth)
 Chris Slade (AC/DC, The Firm, Manfred Mann's Earth Band, Asia, Uriah Heep)
 Marc Slutsky (Splender, Peter Murphy, Bauhaus)
 Chad Smith (Red Hot Chili Peppers, Glenn Hughes, Chikenfoot, Joe Satriani)
 Marvin Smith (The Tonight Show with Jay Leno)
 Marvin "Bugalu" Smith (The Sun Ra Arkestra)
 Mike Smith (Suffocation)
 Neal Smith (Alice Cooper)
 Steve Smith (Journey, Vital Information)
 Spencer Smith (Panic! at the Disco)
 Travis Smith (Trivium)
 Ty Smith (Bullets and Octane, Guttermouth)
 Willie "Big Eyes" Smith (Muddy Waters)
 Aaron Solowoniuk (Billy Talent)
 Yoyoka Soma (Kaneaiyoyoka)
 Matt Sorum (The Cult, Guns N' Roses, Velvet Revolver)
 Jerry Speiser (Men at Work, Frost)
 Henry Spinetti (Eric Clapton, Pete Townshend, Paul McCartney)
 Squarepusher
 John Stanier (Helmet, Battles, Tomahawk)
 Zak Starkey (The Who, Oasis)
 John "Jabo" Starks (James Brown)
 Ringo Starr (The Beatles)
 Thomas Stauch (Blind Guardian, Savage Circus)
 John Steel  (The Animals)
 Shaun Steels (Anathema)
 Branden Steineckert (The Used, Rancid)
 Jody Stephens (Big Star)
 Ronnie Stephenson
 Bill Stevenson (Descendents, Black Flag)
 Bill Stewart
 Tommy Stewart (Godsmack, Lo-Pro)
 Tyler Stewart (Barenaked Ladies)
 Harry Stinson (Marty Stuart)
 Andy Strachan (Living End)
 Jesper Strömblad (In Flames)
 Claudio Strunz (Hermética)
 Clyde Stubblefield (James Brown)
 Andy Sturmer  (Jellyfish, Beatnik Beatch)
 Richard Stuverud (Fastbacks, War Babies, Three Fish, RNDM) 
 Todd Sucherman (Styx)
  James Owen Sullivan (A.K.A. "The Rev") (Avenged Sevenfold, Pinkly Smooth)
 Dave Suzuki (Vital Remains)
 Daniel Svensson (In Flames)
 Dan Swanö (Bloodbath, Edge of Sanity, Nightingale, Ribspreader, Sörskogen)
 Darrell Sweet (Nazareth)
 Robert Sweet (Stryper)
 Chad Szeliga (Breaking Benjamin, Black Label Society, Black Star Riders)

T

 Jeremy Taggart (Our Lady Peace)
 Kevin Talley (Chimaira, Daath, Misery Index)
 Christian Tanna (I Mother Earth)
 Michael Tapper (We Are Scientists)
 Grady Tate
 Yoshida Tatsuya (Ruins)
 Dallas Taylor (Crosby, Stills and Nash, Manassas, Van Morrison)
 Mel Taylor (The Ventures)
 Phil Taylor (Motörhead)
 Roger Taylor (Duran Duran)
 Roger Taylor (Smile, Queen, Queen + Paul Rodgers)
 Dolphin Taylor (Stiff Little Fingers, Tom Robinson Band)
 Joel Taylor
 Ted (Dead Kennedys)
 John Tempesta (Testament, White Zombie, Helmet)
 Mike Terrana (Masterplan)
 Jon Theodore (The Mars Volta)
 Alex Thomas
 Michael Thomas (Bullet for My Valentine)
 Pete Thomas (The Attractions)
 Chester Thompson (Frank Zappa, Weather Report, Genesis, Phil Collins)
 Paul Thompson (Roxy Music)
 Paul Thomson (Franz Ferdinand)
 Tony Thompson (Chic)
 Thunderstick (Paul Samson)
 Tjodalv (Old Man's Child, Dimmu Borgir, Susperia, Gromth)
 Brian Tichy (Billy Idol)
 Srđan Todorović (Ekatarina Velika)
 Lol Tolhurst (The Cure)
 Tico Torres (Bon Jovi)
 Trym Torson (Emperor)
 Stuart Tosh (Pilot, The Alan Parsons Project)
 Rob Townsend (Family)
 Rachel Trachtenburg (Trachtenburg Family Slideshow Players)
 Todd Trainer (Shellac)
 Gene Trautmann (Eagles of Death Metal, Queens of the Stone Age, The Miracle Workers)
 Scott Travis (Judas Priest, Racer X)
 Art Tripp (The Mothers of Invention, Frank Zappa, Captain Beefheart)
 Butch Trucks (The Allman Brothers Band)
 Christopher Tsagakis (RX Bandits)
 Moe Tucker (The Velvet Underground)
 Mick Tucker (Sweet)
 Nick Turner
 George Tutuska (Goo Goo Dolls, Jackdaw)
 Twink (The Pretty Things, Pink Fairies)

U

 Lars Ulrich (Metallica, Merciful Fate)
David Uosikkinen (The Hooters)

V

 Tobi Vail (Bikini Kill)
 Ville Valo
 Christian Vander (Magma)
 Alex Van Halen (Van Halen)
 Peter Van Hooke (Mike + The Mechanics)
 Ronnie Vannucci Jr. (The Killers)
 David Van Tieghem
 Dirk Verbeuren (Soilwork, Scarve, Megadeth)
 Butch Vig (Garbage)
 Brian Viglione (The Dresden Dolls)
 Nick Vincent
 Ivan Voshchyna (Pikkardiyska Tertsia)
 Chris Vrenna (Nine Inch Nails, Tweaker)

W

 Brooks Wackerman (Avenged Sevenfold, Suicidal Tendencies, Bad Religion)
 Chad Wackerman
 Narada Michael Walden (Jeff Beck, Journey)
 Matt Walker (Filter, The Smashing Pumpkins)
 Gary Wallis (Pink Floyd)
 Ed Warby (Gorefest)
 Andy Ward (Camel)
 Bill Ward (Black Sabbath)
 John Ware (Emmylou Harris)
 Joey Waronker (Beck, The Smashing Pumpkins, Elliott Smith, R.E.M.)
 Rey Washam (Scratch Acid, Rapeman, Ministry)
 Kenny Washington
 Charlie Watts (The Rolling Stones)
 Jeff "Tain" Watts
 John Weathers (Gentle Giant)
 Leroy Wallace (Inner Circle, Gregory Isaacs)
 Louie Weaver (Petra)
 Chick Webb
 Dave Weckl
 Ariën van Weesenbeek (Epica, God Dethroned)
 Jay Weinberg (Slipknot)
 Max Weinberg (E Street Band, The Max Weinberg 7, Bruce Springsteen)
 Janet Weiss (Sleater-Kinney, Quasi)
 Ron Welty (The Offspring, Steady Ground)
 Mike Wengren (Disturbed)
 Paul Wertico (Pat Metheny)
 Sandy West (The Runaways)
 Alan White (Oasis)
 Alan White (Plastic Ono Band, Yes)
 Andy White
 Fred White (Earth, Wind, & Fire)
 Jack White
 Jim White (Dirty Three)
 Lenny White
 Maurice White (Ramsey Lewis, Earth, Wind, & Fire)
 Meg White  (The White Stripes)
 Steve White (Paul Weller)
 Dan Whitesides (The Used)
 Alan Wilder (Depeche Mode)
 Peter Wildoer (Darkane, Old Man's Child, James LaBrie, Arch Enemy, Armageddon, Time Requiem, Pestilence)
 Brad Wilk (Rage Against the Machine, Audioslave)
 Adam "Atom" Willard (The Offspring, Angels & Airwaves, The Special Goodness)
 Boris Williams (The Cure)
 Hank Williams III
 Johnny Williams (Raymond Scott)
 Pharrell Williams (The Neptunes, N*E*R*D)
 Steve Williams
 Terry Williams (Love Sculpture, Man, Rockpile, Neverland Express, Dire Straits)
 Tony Williams
 Van Williams  (Nevermore)
 B. J. Wilson (Procol Harum)
 Dennis Wilson (The Beach Boys)
 Patrick "Pat" Wilson (Weezer)
 Ron Wilson (Surfaris)
 Shadow Wilson
 Pick Withers (Dire Straits)
 Alex Wolff (Nat and Alex Wolff)
 Stevie Wonder
 Dan Woodgate (Madness, Voice of the Beehive)
 Mick Woodmansey (David Bowie's Spiders from Mars)
 Sam Woodyard (Duke Ellington)
 Alan Wren (The Stone Roses)
 Simon Wright (AC/DC, Dio)
 Jon Wurster
 Robert Wyatt (Soft Machine, Matching Mole, Kevin Ayers, Henry Cow, Brian Eno, David Gilmour)
 Thomas Wydler (Nick Cave & The Bad Seeds, Die Haut)
 Howard Wyeth

Y

 Shinya Yamada (Luna Sea)
 Tim Yeung (Divine Heresy, Hate Eternal, Vital Remains)
 Yip Sai Wing (Beyond)
 Melissa York (Team Dresch, The Butchies)
 Pete York (The Spencer Davis Group, Jon Lord)
 Adrian Young  (No Doubt)
 Yoshiki (musician) (X-Japan)
 Yukihiro (L'Arc-en-Ciel)

Z

 Nir Zidkyahu  (Genesis, Ray Wilson)
 Dan Zimmermann (Gamma Ray)
 Jay Ziskrout (Bad Religion)
 Zoro (Lenny Kravitz)
 Cesar Zuiderwijk (Golden Earring)

See also 

 List of electronic drum performers
 List of female drummers
 List of heavy metal drummers
 List of jazz drummers
 List of percussionists
 Drummerworld
 Drummer jokes

Drummers
 
Drumming